Marcel Desaulniers (born 1945) is an American chef who was part-owner of the Trellis Restaurant in Williamsburg, Virginia, a cookbook author, director Emeritus of the Culinary Institute of America, and self-described "Guru of Ganache". He is the author of the 1992 book Death by Chocolate.

Personal life
Desaulniers was born in Woonsocket, Rhode Island, and resides in Williamsburg with his wife, Connie, who is an artist. He graduated from Mount Saint Charles Academy in 1963, and from the Culinary Institute of America in 1965. He served in the United States Marine Corps and is a Vietnam veteran.

His daughter, Danielle Desaulniers, is a respected sommelier and restaurant consultant who also trained at the Culinary Institute of America. She has worked at San Francisco's One Market Restaurant and at New York City's Restaurant Daniel, Café Boulud, Ducasse, and Del Frisco's Double Eagle Steak House.

Professional life

Restaurant
In 1980 Desaulniers opened the Trellis Restaurant in colonial Williamsburg's Merchants Square. Desaulniers also opened a food and art studio in Williamsburg called Ganache Hill.  Desaulniers and his business partner, John Curtis, sold The Trellis to chef David Everett, proprietor of the Blue Talon Bistro, also located in the Square, after 29 years of operation.  The restaurant was inducted into the Nation's Restaurant News Fine Dining Hall of Fame in 1995. Desaulniers and his wife opened a new business, MAD about Chocolate, on April 24, 2012 (www.madaboutchocolate.us).  MAD about Chocolate offered Desaulniers' sumptuous desserts, cookies, cakes, ice cream, and other sweet and savory items.  It was located at 204 Armistead Ave. in Williamsburg, VA.  MAD about Chocolate also served as a gallery for Connie Desaulniers' art.  The couple sold the business in February 2016.

Television
He has hosted several television cooking shows including "The Burgermeister" and "Death by Chocolate" and has appeared on Julia Child's television show, Baking with Julia and on PBS' cooking shows Cook-off America and Grilling Maestros.

Cookbooks
Desaulniers has written 10 cooking books including Death by Chocolate (1992). His concentration on chocolate cuisine and his fondness for chocolate ganache has earned him the sobriquet of "Guru of Ganache."

Awards and honors
 Ivy Award: The Trellis, Restaurants and Institutions Magazine, 1989
 Best Chef: Mid-Atlantic, James Beard Foundation, 1993
 Best Pastry Chef: Mid-Atlantic James Beard Foundation
 Best Dessert Book, James Beard Foundation, 1993
 Best Single Subject Cookbook: The Burger Meisters, James Beard Foundation, 1995
 Lifetime Achievement Award, Culinary Institute of America, 1996
 Outstanding Pasty Chef, James Beard Foundation, 1999
 Honor Roll of American Chefs, Food & Wine Magazine

Bibliography

Notes

External links
 Global Gourmet - Marcel Desaulniers
 Baking with Julia - Marcel Desaulniers
 The Trellis, Williamsburg, VA
 Interview with Marcel Desaulniers
 Culinary Institute of America - Alumni Spotlight

1945 births
Living people
American food writers
American restaurateurs
American television chefs
American male chefs
Culinary Institute of America Hyde Park alumni
Culinary Institute of America people
People from Williamsburg, Virginia
James Beard Foundation Award winners
Chefs from Rhode Island